The Liuhe Night Market is a tourist night market in Sinsing District, Kaohsiung, Taiwan. It is one of the most popular markets in Taiwan where seafood, handicrafts, clothing, knives, cameras and live animals are sold.

History
In the 1950s, there had been many food stalls stationed in Dagangpu area of Sinsing District collectively known as Dagangpu Night Market. Since then, the night market has been developed into a large-scale market known as Liuhe Night Market. Recently the market has begun selling halal foods at its stalls. In 2019, the government provided subsidies to a number of stalls of the night market to encourage them to apply for halal certifications from the International Muslim Tourism Industry Development Association.

Transportation
The night market is accessible by walking distance west from exits 1, 9, and 11 of the Formosa Boulevard Station of the Kaohsiung MRT.

See also 
Night markets in Taiwan
List of night markets in Taiwan

References

Night markets in Kaohsiung